Oetters is an unincorporated community in Franklin County, in the U.S. state of Missouri. The community sits above the Missouri River floodplain along Missouri Route T. Fiddle Creek passes adjacent to the community as it enters the Missouri River floodplain.

The community most likely has the name of Henry Oeters, original owner of the site.

References

Unincorporated communities in Franklin County, Missouri
Unincorporated communities in Missouri